Eupithecia dalhousiensis is a moth in the family Geometridae. It is found in Afghanistan and the western Himalayas (northern Pakistan and northern India).

The wingspan is about 24–29 mm for males and 30–37 mm for females. The fore- and hindwings are pale brown to fawn.

The larvae are thought to feed on the cones of Pinus species.

References

Moths described in 2008
dalhousiensis
Moths of Asia